Theodore Williams Noyes (January 26, 1858 - July 4, 1946) was an American journalist. He was the editor-in-chief of Washington, DC's Evening Star newspaper for thirty-eight years.

He was the first son of Crosby Stuart Noyes and Elizabeth Selina Williams.
After attending public schools in Washington, Theodore entered the preparatory program at Columbian College (which later became George Washington University) at age 12. In 1877, at the age of 19, he graduated with a Master of Arts degree and began his career as a reporter for the Star, of which his father Crosby Noyes had become part owner and editor in chief in 1867.
After four years, he returned to Columbian to attend law school, receiving his LL.B. in 1882 and his LL.M. in 1883.

Upon graduation, he was in poor health from rheumatic fever and so did not return to the Star but accepted a job with the law firm Boyse, Noyes, and Boyse in the drier climate of Sioux Falls, Dakota Territory. He wrote a weekly column for the Sioux Falls Press, helped draft the plan for state government for the territory, and was elected county judge. However, before taking office, he returned to Washington in 1886 to accept an associate editor's post at the Star.

On August 11, 1886, he married Mary E. Prentice. They had three children, Ruth,
Elizabeth, and Theodore Prentice.  She died on November 16, 1928.

References

American male journalists
Columbian College of Arts and Sciences alumni
1858 births
1946 deaths
Noyes family